Øystese is a village in the municipality of Kvam in Vestland county, Norway. Norwegian County Road 7 passes through the village. It is now considered part of the Norheimsund urban area, so separate village statistics are no longer tracked.

The village is an industry centre for the municipality. It is a leading producer of lumber and there are also several furniture factories. The furniture design and manufacturing company Arthur Soltvedt Møbelfabrikk, also known as Pega Furniture, was first founded in Øystese in 1942. There is a dairy and cheese factory in Øystese.  The factory used to produce gammalost cheese until 1990 when the production of that particular kind of cheese was moved to a different factory in Vikøyri.

The Øystese Church from 1868 is located in the village center.  There is also a primary school and a secondary school located in Øystese.

See also
 Arthur Soltvedt Møbelfabrikk — A furniture company first founded in Øystese during World War II.
 Notable residents of Kvam

References

External links
Øystese.no 
Cider Festival 

Villages in Vestland
Kvam